The Women's 3000 metres event  at the 2009 European Athletics Indoor Championships was held on March 6–7.

Doping
Anna Alminova originally came sixth in the race, but was disqualified in 2014 after the IAAF handed her a doping ban caused by abnormalities in her biological passport profile. All her results from 16 February 2009 onwards were annulled.

Medalists

Results

Heats 
First 4 of each heat (Q) and the next 4 fastest (q) qualified for the final.

Final

References

Results

3000 metres at the European Athletics Indoor Championships
2009 European Athletics Indoor Championships
2009 in women's athletics